Cellulose triacetate, triacetate, CTA or TAC is a chemical compound produced from cellulose and a source of acetate esters, typically acetic anhydride.  Triacetate is commonly used for the creation of fibres and film base. It is chemically similar to cellulose acetate. Its distinguishing characteristic is that in triacetate, at least "92 percent of the hydroxyl groups are acetylated." During the manufacture of triacetate, the cellulose is completely acetylated; whereas in normal cellulose acetate or cellulose diacetate, it is only partially acetylated.  Triacetate is significantly more heat resistant than cellulose acetate.

History
Triacetate, whose chemical formula is [C6H7O2(OOCCH3)3]n, was first produced commercially in the U.S. in 1954 by Celanese Corporation. Eastman Kodak was a manufacturer of CTA until March 15, 2007. For almost 3 years, Mitsubishi Rayon Co. Ltd. was the only manufacturer. In 2010, Eastman Chemical announced a 70% increase in cellulose triacetate output at its Kingsport (TN) manufacturing site to achieve the increasing demand for the chemical's use as an intermediate in the production of polarized films for liquid crystal displays.

Production
Triacetate is derived from cellulose by acetylating cellulose with acetic acid and/or acetic anhydride.  Acetylation converts hydroxyl groups in cellulose to acetyl groups, which renders the cellulose polymer much more soluble in organic solvents. The cellulose acetate is dissolved in a mixture of dichloromethane and methanol for spinning. As the filaments emerge from a spinneret, the solvent is evaporated in warm air, in a process known as dry spinning, leaving a fibre of almost pure triacetate.

A finishing process called S-Finishing or surface saponification is sometimes applied to acetate and triacetate fabrics using a sodium hydroxide solution.  This removes part or all of the acetyl groups from the surface of the fibres leaving them with a cellulose coating.  This reduces the tendency for the fibres to acquire a static charge.

Applications

As a fibre
Triacetate fibres have a crenate cross section.

Characteristics
Shrink resistant
Wrinkle resistant
Easily washable
Often washable at high temperatures
Maintains creases and pleats well

Usage scenarios
Triacetate is particularly effective in clothing where crease or pleat retention is important, such as skirts and dresses.

In the 1980s triacetate was also used with polyester to create shiny tracksuits. The fabric was smooth and shiny on the outside and soft and fleecy on the inside.

General care tips
Ironable up to 200 °C
Pleated garments are best hand laundered. Most other garments containing 100% triacetate can be machine washed and dried
Articles containing triacetate fibres require little special care due mainly to the fibre's stability at high temperatures

As a film

Characteristics
Resistant to grease, oil, aromatic hydrocarbons, and most common solvents
Films have hard glossy surfaces
Excellent optical clarity
High dielectric constant
Easily laminated, coated, folded, and die-cut
Cellulose acetate film prone to degradation known as vinegar syndrome

Usage scenarios
Polarizer films for LCD projectors
Specialized overhead projector transparencies
Specialized photographic film
Motion picture film
Production of animation cels
Packaging
Face screens

As a semipermeable membrane

Usage scenarios
Water purification through reverse osmosis. The membrane may consist of a blend of cellulose acetate, diacetate and triacetate.

See also
 Cellulose acetate
 Vinegar syndrome
 Rayon

References

External links
 Description of triacetate fibre
 Description of triacetate film
  Federal Trade Commission definition of triacetate
 The long term archival of triacetate photographic films
 Glossary of terms relation to the manufacture of cellulose / acetate fibres
 Fundamentals of membranes for water treatment

Synthetic fibers
Cellulose
Acetate esters